Cosme District is one of eleven districts of the province Churcampa in Peru.

See also 
 Yana Urqu

References